Taidu can refer to:

 Taite, an ancient Middle Eastern city
 Taiwan independence, as the Mandarin Chinese pronunciation of the term